Holetschek is a lunar impact crater on the far side of the Moon, to the south-southeast of the huge walled plain Gagarin. To the east of Holetschek is the crater Sierpinski. To the west-southwest is the larger satellite crater Holetschek R.

The perimeter of this crater forms a nearly symmetric circle, with a slight outward bulge to the south-southeast. The rim is not significantly eroded, but a small craterlet is attached to the northern rim, joining it to the satellite crater Holetschek Z to the north. The inner walls are slumped in places, forming a pile of talus along the western base. The interior floor is otherwise relatively featureless.

Satellite craters
By convention these features are identified on lunar maps by placing the letter on the side of the crater midpoint that is closest to Holetschek.

References

 
 
 
 
 
 
 
 
 
 
 
 

Impact craters on the Moon